Paradise is the name of an area at approximately  on the south slope of Mount Rainier in Mount Rainier National Park in Washington, United States. Southeast of Seattle, the area lies on the border of Pierce and Lewis counties and includes the Paradise Valley and the Paradise Glacier, the source of the Paradise River. Virinda Longmire named Paradise in the summer of 1885 while she viewed the wildflowers in the alpine meadows there. Paradise also offers views of Mount Rainier and the Tatoosh Range.<ref name=Paradise>[https://news.google.com/newspapers?id=-lZWAAAAIBAJ&sjid=o-sDAAAAIBAJ&dq=tatoosh%20range&pg=6259%2C3661944 "Building isn't quite paradise.] Eugene Register-Guard, June 14, 1999. Accessed on July 15, 2011, from Google News Archive.</ref>

Tourism and history
Paradise is the most popular destination for visitors to Mount Rainier National Park. 62% of the over 1.3 million people who visited the park in 2000 went to Paradise. The road from the Nisqually entrance of the National Park to Paradise (State Route 706) is one of the few roads in the park open to automobiles in the winter.

Paradise is the location of the historic Paradise Inn (built 1916), Paradise Guide House (built 1920) and Henry M. Jackson Visitor Center (built 1966; replaced 2008; original building demolished 2009). The inn is listed in the National Register of Historic Places. The historic center of Paradise was designated the Paradise Historic District.

A golf course was built in the area in 1931; five years later, a rope tow for alpine skiing was installed. These were both added as facilities for use by the guests of the inn. From 1942 to 1943, the U.S. Army used the inn to house troops (87th Mountain Infantry) training for winter mountain conditions.

The National Park Service undertook a two-year, $30 million project to perform renovations and structural work to allow the inn withstand a large earthquake and to replace the "flying saucer-shaped" Henry M. Jackson Visitor Center with a new building of the same name complementing the historic lodge. The inn re-opened in 2008, along with the new visitor center. The old visitor center was demolished in 2009.

Climate
The National Park Service says that "Paradise is the snowiest place on Earth where snowfall is measured regularly."  of snow fell during the winter of 1971–1972, setting a world record at the time. The minimum annual snowfall at Paradise was 266 inches in the winter of 2014–15, and the maximum snowpack was 367 inches (30.6 ft, 9.3 m) on March 9–10, 1956. No snowfall measurements were made from 1943 to 1946 as the road to Paradise was closed during World War II. The high snowfall is in spite of no month recording average highs below freezing. Under the Köppen climate classification Paradise has a subpolar oceanic climate that may also be described as subarctic or subalpine''.

References

Bibliography

External links

 Mount Rainier National Park - Paradise (U.S. National Park Service) - Paradise area of the National Park from the National Park Service.
  Paradise Construction Projects: Mount Rainier National Park - Construction at the Paradise Inn and the Henry M. Jackson Visitor Center.

Landmarks in Washington (state)
Geography of Pierce County, Washington
Tourist attractions in Pierce County, Washington
Mount Rainier National Park
Unincorporated communities in Washington (state)